The 2021 Nobel Memorial Prize in Economic Sciences was divided one half awarded to the American-Canadian David Card (b. 1956) "for his empirical contributions to labour economics", the other half jointly to Israeli-American Joshua Angrist (b. 1960) and Dutch-American Guido W. Imbens (b. 1962) "for their methodological contributions to the analysis of causal relationships." The Nobel Committee stated their reason behind the decision, saying: 

Card's key contributions on economics were the natural experiments on labour economics (including difference in differences). Angrist and Imbens' contributions were on the local average treatment effect and natural experiments to estimate causal links.

Laureates

David Card

David Card was born in Guelph, Ontario, in 1956. Card earned his Bachelor of Arts degree from Queen's University in 1978 and his Ph.D. degree in economics in 1983 from Princeton University, after completing a doctoral dissertation, titled "Indexation in long term labor contracts", under the supervision of Orley Ashenfelter. Card began his career at the University of Chicago Graduate School of Business, where he was Assistant Professor of Business Economics for 2 years. He was on the faculty at Princeton University from 1983 to 1997, before moving to Berkeley; from 1990 to 1991 he served as a visiting professor at Columbia University. From 1988 to 1992, Card was Associate Editor of the Journal of Labor Economics and from 1993 to 1997, he was co-editor of Econometrica. From 2002 to 2005, he was co-editor of The American Economic Review. He was the recipient of the 1995 John Bates Clark Medal and the 2014 BBVA Foundation Frontiers of Knowledge Award in Economics, Finance and Management with Richard Blundell "for their contributions to empirical microeconomics."

Joshua Angrist

Angrist was born to a Jewish family in Columbus, Ohio, and raised in Pittsburgh, Pennsylvania, where he graduated from Taylor Allderdice High School in 1977. Angrist received his B.A. in economics from Oberlin College in 1982. He lived in Israel from 1982 until 1985 and served as a paratrooper in the Israeli Defence Forces. Angrist received a M.A. and a Ph.D. in economics from Princeton University in 1987 and 1989, respectively. His doctoral dissertation, Econometric Analysis of the Vietnam Era Draft Lottery, was supervised by Orley Ashenfelter and later published in parts in the American Economic Review. After completing his Ph.D., Angrist joined Harvard University as an assistant professor until 1991, when he returned to Israel as a senior lecturer (equivalent to an Assistant Professor in the US system) at the Hebrew University. After being promoted to associate professor at Hebrew University, he joined MIT's Economics Department in 1996 as associate professor, before being raised to full professor in 1998. Since 2008, he has been MIT's Ford Professor of Economics and teaches econometrics and labor economics to its students. He additionally served as the Wesley Clair Mitchell Visiting Professor at Columbia University in 2018. He was the recipient of the 2011 John von Neumann Award given annually by the Rajk László College for Advanced Studies in Budapest.

Guido Imbens

Guido Wilhelmus Imbens was born on 3 September 1963 in Geldrop, the Netherlands. In high school Imbens was introduced to the work of Dutch economist Jan Tinbergen. Influenced by Tinbergen's work, Imbens chose to study economics at Erasmus University Rotterdam, where Tinbergen had taught and established a program in economics. Imbens graduated with a Candidate's degree in Econometrics from Erasmus University Rotterdam in 1983. He subsequently obtained an M.Sc. degree with distinction in Economics and Econometrics from the University of Hull in Kingston upon Hull, UK in 1986. In 1986, one of Imbens' mentors at the University of Hull, Anthony Lancaster, moved to Brown University in Providence, Rhode Island. Imbens followed Lancaster to Brown to pursue further graduate and doctoral studies. Imbens received an A.M. and a Ph.D. degree  in Economics from Brown in 1989 and 1991, respectively.

References

2021
2021 awards